Chelsea College of Science and Technology was established as a College of Advanced Technology on a single site on the corner of Manresa Road and King's Road, Chelsea, London SW3, as part of the University of London in 1966 and was granted its royal charter in 1971 at which time it was renamed Chelsea College. In 1985, it merged with King's College London.

History

The site on Manresa Road had been earmarked for the college as early as 1890 and was opened as South West Polytechnic in 1895 and became the Chelsea Polytechnic in 1922. By 1965 Parliament was considering a move of the college to St Albans in Hertfordshire. The then Principal, Malcolm Gavin and the Professor of Science, Kevin Keohane were instrumental in the college becoming part of the University of London, and the creation of Britain's first Chair of Science Education.

In 1985 the college merged with nearby Queen Elizabeth College and soon thereafter the merged college was itself amalgamated into King's College London.

It incorporates the old Chelsea Public Library, which is a Grade II* listed building. It was built in 1890, and the architect was J. M. Brydon.

References

Further reading
 Chelsea College - A History (London, 1977)

Educational institutions established in 1895
Education in the Royal Borough of Kensington and Chelsea
History of King's College London
Defunct universities and colleges in London
1895 establishments in England
1985 disestablishments in England
Science and technology in London
Chelsea, London
Buildings designed by J. M. Brydon
Former colleges of the University of London
King's Road, Chelsea, London